Panau brunnescens is a moth in the family Cossidae. It was described by Roepke in 1957. It is found on the Banggaai Archipelago near Sulawesi.

References

Natural History Museum Lepidoptera generic names catalog

Zeuzerinae
Moths described in 1957